The Church of the Mother of God (batumis ghvtismshoblis sakhelobis eklesia) in Batumi is a Georgian Orthodox cathedral, originally built as a Catholic church early in the 1900s. A Gothic Revival design, the church is located in the Black Sea city of Batumi in Georgia's autonomous republic of Adjara.

The church was built as a Roman Catholic church through the sponsorship of the Zubalashvili brothers, Georgian Catholic businessmen, between 1898 and 1902. During the Soviet period the church was closed and converted into a high-voltage laboratory. In 1989 the church was transferred to the Georgian Orthodox Church. The Roman Catholics in Batumi now use the Church of the Holy Spirit, a modern structure consecrated in 2000.

References

Churches completed in 1902
Georgian Orthodox cathedrals in Georgia (country)
Churches in Batumi
Tourist attractions in Adjara
Former Roman Catholic church buildings
20th-century Eastern Orthodox church buildings
20th-century churches in Georgia (country)